Sporting Circle Fola Esch, usually abbreviated to Fola Esch or simply Fola, is a football club, based in Esch-sur-Alzette, in south-western Luxembourg. They play their home games at Stade Émile Mayrisch, in the south of the city, which they share with their sister athletics club CA Fola Esch.

History
Founded in 1906 by the English language teacher Jean Roeder, Fola was the first football club in Luxembourg.  During its heyday, it was the best club in the country, winning four National Division championships and two Luxembourg Cups between 1918 and 1924.  Fola won another championship in 1930 and the Luxembourg Cup in 1955, but had since this time lost its place in Luxembourg's top flight.

Fola stubbornly rejected a merger with its larger neighbours, Jeunesse Esch, during the wave of consolidation in the 1990s. In 2004–05, Fola were relegated to the third tier of Luxembourgish football, but were promoted the following season. In 2006–07 they finished third, qualifying for a promotion play-off, which they lost to Victoria Rosport. In August 2007, Fola pulled off a transfer coup by signing former Morocco midfielder Mustapha Hadji.

In 2008, the club managed to secure second place in the championship, granting them promotion to the Fortis League (National Division, the top league in the country, renamed BGL League in March 2009 due to the financial crisis).

In May 2013, CS Fola Esch won the championship in the BGL Ligue with a historic 5–1 win against their rivals, Jeunesse Esch in the 25th match of the season. The club had a gap of 83 years since their last championship. Stefano Bensi scored 20 goals during this season.

Fola participated in the second qualifying round of the Champions League 2013–14, but lost to Dinamo Zagreb 0–5 in the first leg (at home) and 0–1 in the second leg (away). In 2015, Fola won the championship again, after finishing second in 2014. In 2016 they again finished second with an equal number of points with the champions, F91 Dudelange.

In 2016 CS Fola Esch, celebrated their 110th birthday, and also became a member of the exclusive Club of Pioneers, as the oldest football club of Luxembourg.

History
1906: Club founded as Football and Lawn Tennis Club Esch
1907: Adopts current colours of red and white stripes
1910: Absorbs FC Nerva, becoming Cercle sportif Fola Esch
1918: Wins first championship title
1924: Wins the Double
1930: Wins last championship title for the next 83 years
1935: Moves to current stadium, Stade Émile Mayrisch
1955: Wins Luxembourg Cup, last title before a long lean period
1973: First participation in European competition (season 1973–74)
2013: Wins first championship since 83 years, followed by another champion title in 2015
2017: First qualification to the second round and to the third round in European competition

Honours
National Division
Champions (8): 1917–18, 1919–20, 1921–22, 1923–24, 1929–30, 2012–13, 2014–15, 2020–21
Runners-up (10): 1916–17, 1918–19, 1920–21, 1928–29, 1948–49, 1953–54, 1954–55, 2010–11, 2013–14, 2018–19

Luxembourg Cup
Winners: 1922–23, 1923–24, 1954–55
Runners-up: 1972–73, 2016–17

European competition

Matches

Current squad

Former coaches

References

External links
CS Fola homepage
football-lineups

Football clubs in Luxembourg
Sports teams in Esch-sur-Alzette
Association football clubs established in 1906
1906 establishments in Luxembourg